Maggie Smith is an English actress who has worked in theatre, television, and film. Smith made her professional theatre debut in 1956 playing Viola in William Shakespeare's Twelfth Night at the Oxford Playhouse. She made her Broadway debut in musical revue New Faces of 1956 (1956). Smith excelled in both comedy and drama performing in various works of Shakespeare, Anton Chekov, Noël Coward, Edward Albee, and Tom Stoppard. She has received three Tony Award nominations for Private Lives (1975), and Night and Day (1980) before winning in 1990 for Lettice and Lovage.

Smith also known for her film roles, started acting in the late 1950s before gaining her breakout film role in Othello (1965) where she acted alongside Laurence Olivier and Michael Gambon. She received her first Academy Award for her performance in The Prime of Miss Jean Brodie (1969). She received her second win for her role as an Oscar loser in Neil Simon's California Suite (1978). She's also known for her performances in Travels with My Aunt (1972), Death on the Nile (1978), A Room with a View (1986), Richard III (1995), Gosford Park (2001), and Quartet (2012). Smith also starred in the popular films Hook (1991), Sister Act (1992), The Secret Garden (1993), and The Best Exotic Marigold Hotel (2011) and its sequel. Smith gained worldwide attention and acclaim for her role as Professor McGonagall in the Harry Potter series (2001-2011).

Smith is also known for her performances in television appearing in various shows including, BBC Sunday Night Theatre, Theatre Royal, Play of the Week, Armchair Theatre, Play of the Month and Screen Two. She also guest starred in The Carol Burnett Show. Smith received Primetime Emmy Award nominations for her work in Suddenly, Last Summer (1992), David Copperfield (1999), and Capturing Mary (2010). Smith won for My House in Umbria (2003). Smith gained international acclaim for her performance in Downton Abbey (2010-2015) as the Violet Crawley, Dowager Countess of Grantham. She received 5 Primetime Emmy Award nominations winning 3 times.

Filmography

Film

Source: IMDb and Turner Classic Movies

Television

Source: Internet Movie Database

Theatre

Video games

See also 
List of awards and nominations received by Maggie Smith

References

External links 
 
 
 

Actress filmographies
British filmographies